Claude Rolley (11 November 1933, Saint-Lô (Manche) – 10 February 2007) was a French archaeologist, emeritus at the University of Burgundy, writer on art, archaeology of Greece and Gaule.

Selected publications 
 « Une amphore inédite du Peintre à la Gorgone », in Bulletin de correspondance hellénique, année 1961, vol. 85, n°85, (p. 539–543).
 « Deux têtes féminines d'époque classique », in Bulletin de correspondance hellénique, vol.89, n°89, 1965 (p. 317–331).
 « Le Sanctuaire des dieux Patrôoi et le Thesmophorion de Thasos », in Bulletin de correspondance hellénique, n°89, 1965, (p. 441–482)
 « Antiquités, Donation Granville », in Bulletin des Musées Royaux d'Art et d'Histoire, vol.37,  T. III, publication du musée des beaux-arts de Dijon, 1967, (p. 12–77)
 « Bronzes géométriques et orientaux à Délos », in Bulletin de correspondance hellenique, Supplément, Vol. 1, issue suppl 1, 1973, (p. 491–524)
 « Deux lions, deux couteaux », in L'Écho d'Auxerre, n°115, 1975.
 « D'où vient la Vénus de Saint-Père? », in Congrès de l'Association Bourguignonne des Sociétés Savantes, 1981.
 Bronzes antiques de l'Yonne, Musée archéologique de Dijon, with Claude Mordant, Jean Guillaumet et musée archéologique, 1982.
 Les bronzes grecs, Office du Livre, Fribourg, 1983, 270 p.
 De Delphes à Magny-Lambert, Hommages à Lucien Lerat, 2-Paris, 1984, (p. 727–733)
 Greek Bronzes, Sotheby's, première édition, juillet 1986 
 « Le Sanctuaire d'Evraiokastro », in Lazarivdh, 1986, (p. 405–408).
 « Importations Méditerranéennes et repères chronologiques », in Les Princes celtes en Méditerranée, rencontres de l'École du Louvre, La Documentation Française, May 1988, (p. 93–102).
 « La Sardaigne entre deux livres, Trafics des Bronzes au début du 1er millénaire Av.J-C. », in Mélanges de l'École française de Rome, 100, fasc. 1, 1988, (p. 299–304).
 with William Mouret, R. Boyer, Techniques antiques du bronze ; faire un vase, faire un casque, faire une fibule, Dijon, université de Bourgogne, Centre de recherches sur les techniques gréco-romaines, 91, 1988, (p. 18) 
 « Les Deux têtes de Nod-sur-Seine, (Côte-d'Or), proposition de datation », in Revue archéologique de l'Est et du Centre-Est, 40, fasc. 2, 1989, (p. 259–262).
 with Jean-Paul Delor, « L'Yonne et son passé ; 30 ans d'archéologie », [catalogue de l'exposition d'Auxerre en 1989], édition CDRA, CRRAB, Auxerre, 1989, 321 p.
 « L'Yonne et son passé », in Archéologia [préhistoire et archéologie-Dijon], t.255, 1990, (p. 48–55).
 « Les bronzes grecs et romains, recherches récentes », in Revue archéologique, X-XII, 1990, (p. 405–422).
 With Michel Feuchère, La vaisselle tardo-républicaine en bronze, [acte de la table-ronde CNRS, organisée à Lattes du 26 au 28 avril 1990], Dijon, Université de Bourgogne, Centre de recherches sur les techniques gréco-romaines, VI, 1991, 211p., 
 « Le cas de la Grèce : l'origine des sanctuaires », in Les sanctuaires celtiques et le Monde méditerranéen, [Actes du Colloque de Saint-Riquier], 8-11 novembre 1990, Paris, 1991, (p. 136–138).
 « Les bronzes grecs et romains, recherches récentes XIII-Varia 1989 », in Revue archéologique, Paris, 1991,(p. 281–296).
 « Les Messapiens : un peuple indigène d'Italie du Sud », in Archéologia, n°269, Dijon, 1991, (p. 44–50).
 « Un bracelet celtique dans le Châtillonnais », in Revue archéologique de l'Est et du Centre-Est, 43, fasc. 1, n°161, 1992, (p. 151–153).
 « Un dieu Gaulois près de Vezelay », in Bulletin de la Société d'études d'Avallon, 74, 1993
 « Une importation à supprimer ; le trépied d'Auxerre », in Revue archéologique de l'Est et du Centre-Est, 44, fasc. 1, n°163, 1993, (p. 191–192).
 Dieu de bronze, dieux de pierre, dieux de terre ; y a-t-il un répertoire des bronziers en Gaule?, [actes du Congreso internacional de bronce antiguos (Madrid, novembre 1990)], 1993, (p. 367–381).
 « La Déesse sur le bateau des sources de la Seine », in Akten der 10.Tagung über antike Bronzen, 1994, (p. 371–372).
 La Sculpture grecque, des origines au milieu du Ve, T.I, Paris, Éd. Picard, 1994, 440p., 48 illustrations, 
 « Les Bronzes grecs et romains : recherches récentes », in Revue archéologique, fasc.2, 1994, (p. 323–346).
 « Les Bronzes grecs et romains : recherches récentes », in Revue archéologique, t.II, 1996, (p. 269–291).
 « Les Échanges », in Vix et les éphémères principautés celtiques, Paris, 1997, (p. 239–242).
 « Les Bronzes grecs et romains, recherches récentes », in Revue archéologique, fasc. 2, 1997, (p. 313–315).
 « Encore les aphidrumata sur la foundation de Marseille, de Thasos et de Rome », in AION (Arch) (Annali delle' Istuto universitario orientale di Napoli. Dipart di studi del mondo classico e del Medterraneo antico. Sezione di archeologia e storia antica -Napoli), t.4, 1997, (p. 35–43).
 with Fabienne Olmer, Les Amphores romaines en Bourgogne : contribution à l'histoire économique de la région dans l'Antiquité, depuis la Tène finale jusqu'au Haut-Empire, 4 vol., 1997, 361 p.
 
 with Michel Pernod, Techniques antiques du bronze, 2. Méthodes d'études-procédés de fabrication, Dijon, université de Bourgogne, Centre de Recherches sur les techniques gréco-romaines, 1999, 78 p. 
 « Aphrodite », in La Sculpture grecque, t.II., « La période classique », Paris. 1999, 440 p., (p. 213–258) 
 with Jean-Paul Delor, « Nécropole de Gurgy “La Picardie” (Yonne) », in Mémoire de la Société archéologique champenoise, 15, 1999, (p. 341–356).
 with Claude Péquinot, Ginette Picard et la contribution de Jean-Paul Guillaumet, Roland Niaux, Raphël Moreau, « Le Morvan gaulois », in Bulletin de Académie du Morvan, n°51, 2001.
 with Claude Péquinot, Ginette Picard et la collaboration de Vincent Guichard, Michel Kasprzyk, Pierre Nouvel, René Goguey, « Le Morvan gallo-romain », in Bulletin de l'Académie du Morvan n°59, 2001.
 with Claude Mordant, Bruno Chaume, Vix et son territoire à l'Âge du Fer, Montagnac, Éd. Monique Mergoil, 2001, 643 p. 
 « Au musée des Antiquités nationales de Saint-Germain-en-Laye. Une panthère gréco-romaine en bronze : une nouvelle restauration, nouvelles observations », in Revue du Louvre et des musées de France, t.52, 5, 2002 (p. 78–85).
 « Le travail du bronze à Delphes », in I Bronzi Antichi:Produzione e tecnologia -Montagnac, 2002, (p. 94–99).
 La Tombe princière de Vix, 2 vol., Société des Amis du musée du Châtillonnais, Paris, Éd. Picard, 2003, 383 p. 
 « La Tombe princière de Vix dans son contexte historique », in Les Dossiers d'archéologie, n°284, 2003, (p. 36–43).
 « Analyse stylistique d'Éros/Cupidon - Analyse stylistique de l'enfant romain », in Mystère des bronzes antiques, 2003, (p. 28)
 « Des reliefs de la Chancellerie au Montmartre d'Avallon : la politique religieuse de Domitien en Gaule », in Revue archéologique, t.1, 2004, (p. 159–163).
 « Bronzes grecs et romains : recherches récentes », in Revue archéologique, n°2, 2005, (p. 339–364).
 with : Olivier Caumont, Xavier Margarit, Benoît Mille, Paolo Piccardo, « Un bras d'empereur romain en bronze à Essegney (Vosges) », in Revue archéologique de l'Est et du Centre-Est-Dijon, t. 55, 2006, (p. 173–195) (online).
 « Vrai ou faux ? : le cas de la sculpture grecque », in Les Dossiers d'archéologie, Éd. Faton, n°312, 2006, (p. 68–75).
 « Les Civilisés et les Barbares du Ve au IIe, Celtes, Gaulois», Coll. « L'Archéologie face à l'histoire »,  direction Miklos Szabo, Éd. CAE Européen Mont-Beuvray, [Actes de la table-ronde de Budapest des 17-18 juin 2005], 2006 
 « Identités ethniques dans le monde grec antique, techniques, le travail, la naissance des styles de l'époque géométrique », in Pallas,63-70, 73, [Actes du Colloque International de Toulouse organisé par le CRATA les 9-11 mars 2006], Presse Universitaire du Mirail, 2007. 275 p. [voir Rolley (1969) & Heilmeyer (1974) pour les chevaux surtout, rapide tableau d'ensemble 1994, (p. 97–101). Rolley BCH 107, 1983, .- BCH 110, 1986, (p. 121–136)].

References

Bibliography 
 Francis Croissant and Stéphane Verger, « Claude Rolley (1933-2007) », in  Revue archéologique, 2007, notes (en ligne).

External links 
 Claude Rolley on data.bnf.fr

1933 births
2007 deaths
French archaeologists
École Normale Supérieure alumni
Members of the French School at Athens
People from Saint-Lô
20th-century archaeologists